Thomy Charles Bourdelle (20 April 1891 – 27 June 1972) was a French actor.

Bourdelle was born in Paris and died in Toulon, Var, France.

Selected filmography
Roger la Honte (1922)
 Surcouf (1925)
 Jocaste (1925)
 Jean Chouan (1926)
 The Martyrdom of Saint Maxence (1928)
 Verdun: Visions of History (1928)
 Yvette (1928)
 The Divine Voyage (1929)
 Under the Roofs of Paris (1930)
 The Rebel (1931)
 The Devil's Holiday (1931)
 Danton (1932)
 Fifty Fathoms Deep  (1932)
 Transit Camp (1932)
 Fantômas (1932)
 The Three Musketeers (1932)
 Le testament du Dr. Mabuse (1933)
 The Star of Valencia (1933)
 Bastille Day (1933)
 The House on the Dune (1934)
 The Man with a Broken Ear (1934)
 Maria Chapdelaine (1934)
 The Call of Silence (1936)
 Seven Sinners (1936)
 Arsene Lupin, Detective (1937)
 The Men Without Names (1937)
 Adrienne Lecouvreur (1938)
 Brazza ou l'épopée du Congo (1940)
 Jeannou (1943)
 The Black Cavalier (1945)
 Vendetta in Camargue (1950)
 Captain Ardant (1951)
 Grand Gala (1952)
 Alarm in Morocco (1953)
 Double or Quits (1953)
 The Return of Don Camillo (1953)
 Tabor (1954)
 Le rouge est mis (1957)
 Head Against the Wall (1958)

Bibliography
 Powrie, Phil & Rebillard, Éric. Pierre Batcheff and stardom in 1920s French cinema. Edinburgh University Press, 2009 
 Kalat, David. The Strange Case of Dr. Mabuse: A Study of the Twelve Films and Five Novels. McFarland, 2005.

External links

1890s births
1972 deaths
French male film actors
French male silent film actors
Male actors from Paris
20th-century French male actors